Henryk Józef Maculewicz (born 24 April 1950) is a retired Polish footballer. During his club career he played for Wisła Kraków and RC Lens. He earned 23 caps for the Poland national football team, and participated in the 1978 FIFA World Cup.

References

External links

1950 births
Living people
People from Lwówek Śląski County
Polish footballers
Poland international footballers
1978 FIFA World Cup players
Wisła Kraków players
RC Lens players
Ligue 1 players
Paris FC players
Sportspeople from Lower Silesian Voivodeship
Ekstraklasa players
Association football defenders